The year 2016 was the 3rd year in the history of the Kunlun Fight, a kickboxing promotion based in China. 2016 started with Kunlun Fight 36.

The events were broadcasts through television agreements in mainland China with Jiangsu TV and around the world with various other channels. The events were also streamed live on the Kunlun Fight app. Traditionally, most Kunlun Fight events have both tournament fights and superfights (single fights).

Champions

List of events

Kunlun Fight 36 

Results

Kunlun Fight 37

Results

70kg World Max Tournament 2015 bracket

Kunlun Fight 38 / Super Muaythai 2016 

Results

Kunlun Fight 39

Results

Kunlun Fight 40

Results

Kunlun Fight 41

Results

Kunlun Fight 42

Results

Kunlun Fight 43

Results

70kg World Max Group I tournament bracket

70kg World Max Group J tournament bracket

Kunlun Fight 44 / MFP: Mayor's Cup 2016

Results

Kunlun Fight - Cage Fight Series 5 / Top FC 11

Results

Kunlun Fight 45

Results

Kunlun Fight 46

Results

Kunlun Fight 47

Results

75kg Tournament 2016 bracket

Kunlun Fight 48

Results

Kunlun Fight 49 / Rebels 45

Results

Kunlun Fight 50

Results

Kunlun Fight 51

Results

65kg Tournament 2016 bracket

Kunlun Fight 52

Results

Kunlun Fight 53

Results

Kunlun Fight - Cage Fight Series 6

Results

Kunlun Fight 54

Results

Kunlun Fight 55

Results

Kunlun Fight MMA 7

Results

See also
List of Kunlun Fight events
2016 in Glory
2016 in Glory of Heroes
2016 in K-1

References

External links
 http://www.kunlunjue.com/portal/page/index/id/32.html
 http://www.tapology.com/search?term=KUNLUN&mainSearchFilter=events

2016 in kickboxing
Kickboxing in China
Kunlun Fight events
2016 in Chinese sport